Italy competed at the 1983 Mediterranean Games in Casablanca, Morocco.

Medals

Athletics

Men

Women

See also
 Boxing at the 1983 Mediterranean Games
 Volleyball at the 1983 Mediterranean Games

References

External links
 Mediterranean Games Athletic results at Gbrathletics.com
 1983 - CASABLANCA (MOR) at CIJM web site

Nations at the 1983 Mediterranean Games
1983
Mediterranean Games